Ashfield is a village in the civil parish of North Knapdale, in Knapdale, in the council area of Argyll and Bute, Scotland. It has a sheep farm and cottage and once had a school.

History 
The name "Ashfield" is Gaelic and means "the ash slope".

References 

Villages in Knapdale